Denisse Marie Oller (born September 30, 1955 in San Juan, Puerto Rico) is a chef, broadcaster, journalist, newspaper columnist, and a multiple Emmy award-winning and acclaimed national news anchor for Univision Network and Telemundo Network.

Born and raised in San Juan, Puerto Rico, Oller attended the University of Puerto Rico, Río Piedras Campus with a Bachelor of Arts in Finance and a minor in French before attending Hunter College where she graduated summa cum laude with a Bachelor of Arts in Media Studies and a minor in Interpersonal Communications.

Career, Accolades, and Awards 
Oller joined Univision in 1986, serving as a national correspondent based in Miami, also working out of Los Angeles, Washington, and New York, before becoming the main anchor of the network's nationally broadcast weekend edition, making her the first Puerto Rican to anchor a national news show. She won her first Emmy award in 1991 for her coverage of the Gulf War’s heroes arriving home, the first time a Spanish-speaking station in New York was recognized by the Emmy's.

In addition to her experience as a news anchor, Oller has interviewed many world leaders including former US Presidents Ronald Reagan and Bill Clinton, US Secretary of State Hillary Clinton, and Nobel Peace Prize winner and former Costa Rican president, Oscar Arias Sanchez. She has also interviewed prominent artists and writers such as Isabel Allende and Mario Vargas Llosa. Her interview with Zoilamérica Narváez, the stepdaughter of Nicaraguan president Daniel Ortega was highly covered by the Latin American press after she disclosed details of alleged sexual abuse by Ortega. Her familiar and reassuring voice has broadcast stories across the United States and Latin America, covering major news events such as the September 11, 2001 terrorist attacks, the 1995 Oklahoma City bombing, presidential elections and the historic visit of Pope John Paul II to Cuba, where she interviewed both dissidents and government officials.

She has been honored with five Emmy's, two Gracies from the American Women in Radio and Television association, and the prestigious Edward R. Murrow Award for journalism for her coverage of the exit of the United States Navy from the island of Vieques, Puerto Rico after 60 years of military occupation.

A New Career in Community Work 
On November 2, 2007, Oller officially ended her 20-year career in news to pursue independent ventures and to establish Newsworks Productions, a multi-platform entity specializing in contemporary lifestyle topics, including healthy eating and living, and current events.

Currently, Oller is Vice President of Media Relations and Engagement for SOMOS Community Care – a non-profit network that serves more than 650,000 Medicaid recipients in underserved communities in the Bronx, Brooklyn, Manhattan, and Queens. In her role, Oller develops communications and public relations initiatives to advocate for healthcare reform on behalf of SOMOS' network providers and the communities they serve.

She also leads SOMOS Community Care’s DASH (Dietary Approaches to Stop Hypertension) outreach programs that inform, educate, and empower individuals and families about the importance of preventive health care and making healthier lifestyle choices. As an ambassador and ‘madrina’ of SOMOS in the Latino community, Oller spearheads community outreach to improve health literacy about nutrition as prevention in underserved communities where chronic illnesses such as diabetes, cardiovascular disease, and obesity are prevalent.

From 2010 to 2015, Denisse was Executive Director of the Joseph A. Unanue Latino Institute at Seton Hall University where she worked closely with higher education administration and students to extend the Institute’s reach beyond the Seton Hall campus. Particularly noteworthy was her success in establishing partnerships with the corporate sector, private philanthropists, and community-based organizations.

Nutrition Expert 
Utilizing her training as a chef, Oller served as one of the prominent Food and Nutrition Experts for AARP’s online Spanish language food channel at “AARP’s Cocina y Nutricion“, Oller hosts a monthly web-based cooking program and has been a featured writer for AARP/VIVA, the premier bilingual magazine for Hispanics 50+ and their families. Her work with AARP enables Oller to reinvent Latino cuisine, bringing healthy eating choices to thousands of families. A graduate of the Institute of Culinary Education with a specialty in Latin American, Mediterranean cuisine, and healthy cooking, Oller conducted regular and very popular recreational cooking classes at the Institute.

Oller has guest-appeared as a judge on "Throwdown with Bobby Flay" for The Food Network. In addition, she has made appearances on The Today Show, CNN en Espanol, and on Martha Stewart's radio show. She was a guest chef for the 2009 Summit Wine and Food Festival and is one of the spokespeople for the Latino Initiatives program of the American Diabetes Association.

Further Education 
Oller obtained her Graduate Certificate in Non-Profit Management from Seton Hall, and most recently acquired a certificate in Health Coaching from Emory University, and a certificate from the University of Navarra’s IESE Business School’s Graduate Developing Leadership Competencies Program.

See also
List of Puerto Ricans

References

External links
Official website
Denisse Oller on Facebook
Denisse Oller on Twitter

1955 births
American television news anchors
American television reporters and correspondents
Emmy Award winners
Hunter College alumni
Living people
Puerto Rican journalists
Puerto Rican people of Catalan descent
University of Puerto Rico alumni